Jimmy Murphy (born October 11, 1925, Birmingham, Alabama – d. June 1, 1981) was an American country and rockabilly guitarist and singer-songwriter.

Murphy's father, a bricklayer, was a blues enthusiast, and so the young Murphy grew up listening to musicians such as Lead Belly and Blind Boy Fuller. Murphy had already made it to radio by the middle of the 1940s, appearing on local station WBRC's Happy Hal Burns Show. In 1949 he relocated to Knoxville, Tennessee and auditioned for Dinner Bell, a show on WROL hosted by Archie Campbell. Campbell had Murphy meet Chet Atkins, whom Murphy eventually gave a demo; RCA Victor subsequently signed him to a publishing deal and recorded him in January 1951 with just himself on guitar and vocals and Anita Carter playing bass.

Murphy's contract only lasted one year; all of his singles failed to sell. He continued, however, to perform on WROL, and moved to WNOX in the middle of the 1950s. In 1955, Don Law signed Murphy to Columbia Records and had him record a number of rockabilly sides, but none of these charted, and this contract ended in 1956. Murphy followed his father into the bricklaying business and continued playing music on the side, but returned in 1962 to record for Ark Records, Midnite, Loyal, Rimrock, and Starday over the next few years.

He went into retirement until the Library of Congress re-released his first single, "Electricity", on a compilation. Richard Spottswood found Murphy and asked him to begin recording again; the result was the full-length Electricity, released on Sugar Hill Records in 1978. Further recording and a tour had been planned, but Murphy died in 1981 before they could be completed. He has remained a cult figure among rockabilly enthusiasts, and in 1989 Bear Family Records collected his RCA and Columbia recordings (16 songs recorded between 1951 and 1956) and issued them on CD as Sixteen Tons Rock & Roll. 21 recordings from the 1960s were issued in 1999 on the Ace Records (UK) label under the title Southern Roots: The Legendary Starday-REM Sessions

Singles

References
[ Jimmy Murphy] at Allmusic

1925 births
1981 deaths
Musicians from Birmingham, Alabama
American rockabilly musicians
American country singer-songwriters
20th-century American singers
RCA Victor artists
Country musicians from Alabama
Singer-songwriters from Alabama